This is a list of Ukrainian football transfers summer 2019. Only clubs in 2019–20 Ukrainian Premier League and 2019–20 Ukrainian First League are included.

Ukrainian Premier League

Desna Chernihiv

In:

Out:

Dnipro-1

In:

Out:

Dynamo Kyiv

In:

Out:

Karpaty Lviv

In:

Out:

Kolos Kovalivka

In:

Out:

Lviv

In:

Out:

Mariupol

In:

Out:

Oleksandriya

In:

Out:

Olimpik Donetsk

In:

Out:

Shakhtar Donetsk

In:

Out:

Vorskla Poltava

In:

Out:

Zorya Luhansk

In:

Out:

Ukrainian First League

Ahrobiznes Volochysk

In:

 
Out:

Avanhard Kramatorsk

In:

 
Out:

Balkany Zorya

In:

 
Out:

Cherkashchyna Сherkasy

In:

 
Out:

Chornomorets Odesa

In:

 
Out:

Hirnyk-Sport Horishni Plavni

In:

 
Out:

Inhulets Petrove

In:

 
Out:

Kremin Kremenchuk

In:

 
Out:

Metalist 1925 Kharkiv

In:

 
Out:

Metalurh Zaporizhya

In:

 
Out:

MFC Mykolaiv

In:

 
Out:

FC Mynai

In:

 
Out:

Obolon-Brovar Kyiv

In:

 
Out:

Prykarpattia Ivano-Frankivsk

In:

 
Out:

Rukh Lviv

In:

 
Out:

Volyn Lutsk

In:

 
Out:

See also
 Winter 2018–19 transfers

References

Ukraine
Transfers
2019